Meshir 24 - Coptic Calendar - Meshir 26

The twenty-fifth day of the Coptic month of Meshir, the sixth month of the Coptic year. In common years, this day corresponds to February 19, of the Julian Calendar, and March 4, of the Gregorian Calendar. This day falls in the Coptic Season of Shemu, the season of the Harvest.

Commemorations

Martyrs 

 The martyrdom of Saint Philemon, Saint Apphia, and their son, Saint Archippus 
 The martyrdom of Saint Lycia the Virgin 
 The martyrdom of Saint Qouna, in the city of Rome 
 The martyrdom of Saint Mina in the city of Qous

Saints 

 The departure of Saint Abu-Fana in Mount Delga

References 

Days of the Coptic calendar